Alejandro Carrión Aguirre (11 March 1915 – 4 January 1992) was an Ecuadorian poet, novelist and journalist. He wrote the novel La espina (1959), the short story book La manzana dañada (1983), and numerous poetry books.  As a journalist he published many of his articles under the pseudonym "Juan Sin Cielo."  In 1956 he founded, along with Pedro Jorge Vera, the political magazine La Calle.  He directed the literary magazine Letras del Ecuador.  He received the Maria Moors Cabot prize (1961) from the Columbia University Graduate School of Journalism as well as the Ecuadorian National Prize Premio Eugenio Espejo (1981) for his body of work.  He was the nephew of Benjamín Carrión and Clodoveo Carrión.

Biography

The journalist
Alejandro Carrión wrote articles and political commentary in the following periodicals and newspapers:

Newspapers
El Tiempo, Bogotá, 1947
La Tierra, Quito 1942–1948
El Sol, Quito, 1950;
La Razón, Guayaquil, 1968–1969
El Universo, Guayaquil, 1948–1968
Diario Las Américas, Miami, 1970–1979
Diario El Comercio, Quito 1980–1992

Magazines
Revista de la Casa de la Cultura Ecuatoriana, 1945–1950
Letras del Ecuador, 1945–1950
Sábado, Bogotá, 1947
La Calle, Quito 1959–1969
Vistazo, Guayaquil 1969–1992;
Américas, Washington, D.C., 1977–1979
Revista de la Sociedad Jurídico-Literaria, 1981–1982

Bibliography

Poetry

A selection of Alejandro Carrión's poetry was recorded in Quito for the Library of Congress in Washington; a copy of that recording is housed at Harvard University's "House of the Poetry". Alejandro told of his emotional reaction to hearing his own words when visiting in the company of the poet Archibald McLeish: "small satisfactions that illuminate the life of a poet."

 Poemas de un portero - Poems of a Doorman (1932–1934)
 Luz del nuevo paisaje - Light of the New Landscape (1934–1935)
 Poesía de la soledad y el deseo - Poetry of Solitude and Desire  (1934–1939)
 Agonía del árbol y la sangre - Agony of the Tree and the Blood (1934–1944)
 La noche oscura - Dark Night  (1934–1954)
 La sangre sobre la tierra - The Blood on the Earth (1946–1957)
 Nunca! Nunca - Never! Never  (1955–1957)
 El Tiempo que pasa - "Time that Passes" (1957–1962)
 Poeta y peregrino - "Poet and Traveler" (1960–1965)
 Poesia primera jornadad - "Poetry anthology, the early years" (1932–1957)
 Poesia segunda jornada - "Poetry anthology, the final years" (1957–1984)
 Aquí, España Nuestra!, tres poemas en esperanza y amargura (1938)
 Cuaderno de canciones (1954)
 Canto a la América Española (1954)

Novel
1959 La espina

Short Story
1968 Muerte en su Isla
1970 La llave perdida
1978 Mala procesión de hormigas
1983 La manzana dañada
1983 Divino tesoro
1983 Una pequeña muerte

History
1954 Primicias de la poesía quiteña
1957 Los poetas quiteños de "El Ocioso en Faenza"
1978 La otra historia, ensayos
1992 Antología General de la Poesía Ecuatoriana durante la Colonia Española
1992 El último rincón del mundo

Prose
1948 Los compañeros de Don Quixote
1948 Elogio de la novela policíaca
1972 Los Colores del Sueño
1983 Nuestro Simón Bolívar
1983 Galería de retratos
1983 Los caminos de Dios
1983 Gana de hablar
1983 En el país de los Golillas
1983 La pavimentación del infierno

Journalism
1983 Esta vida de Quito por Juan sin Cielo
1992 Una Cierta Sonrisa

References

External links

Early poetry
La manzana dañada
La espina

Ecuadorian poets
Ecuadorian male short story writers
Ecuadorian short story writers
Ecuadorian male writers
Maria Moors Cabot Prize winners
People from Loja, Ecuador
1915 births
1992 deaths
20th-century poets
Ecuadorian male poets
20th-century short story writers
20th-century male writers